Sir William Oliphant (died 1329), Lord of Aberdalgie and Dupplin, was a Scottish magnate, knight and leader during the Wars of Scottish Independence.

Life
Oliphant fought at the Battle of Dunbar in 1296, where the Scots, under their king John Balliol, were defeated by the invading English. Following the battle he was captured and taken to Rochester Castle in England where he was imprisoned. He was released after agreeing to serve King Edward I of England overseas. He returned to Scotland where he was second in command of Stirling Castle under his cousin of the same name, Sir William Oliphant. During the siege of 1304, when the castle was attacked by the forces of Edward I of England, the garrison eventually surrendered to the English. He was captured once again, this time being imprisoned at Wallingford Castle while his cousin the commander was imprisoned in the Tower of London. In this same year all of Scotland with the exception of William Wallace had sworn fealty to Edward I.

For 110 shillings, as "William Olyfaunt, Knight", he was bonded by Hugh le Despenser, the elder and remained in England until 1313. He had a safe conduct to return to Scotland on 21 October of that year and was a witness to a charter of King Robert the Bruce in February 1314–15. He was one of the signatories to the Declaration of Arbroath on 6 April 1320 and his seal is still visible.

Sir William's tomb is in Aberdalgie Churchyard, in Perthshire, within the site of the original church. The effigy is made from "Tournai marble" from northern France or Flanders. The grave lies at the furthest corner of the churchyard close to a small stream.

He left his estates to his son Walter. These included Dupplin, Hedderwick and Cranshaws which he inherited from his Oliphant predecessors; Aberdalgie, Turin, Glensaugh, Pitkerie and Gallery which apparently came into the family from a Wishart heiress; Gasknes, Newtyle, Kinpurnie, Auchtertyre, Balcrais, Muirhouse and Hazelhead acquired as gifts from the King.

Family

The name of Sir William's wife is Isabel Douglas, they had a son:
 Sir Walter Oliphant (Olifaunt) of Aberdalgie and Dupplin, he married Elizabeth, the youngest daughter of King Robert I (Bruce) de Brus. Their descendant, Sir Laurence Oliphant of Aberdalgie, was created Lord Oliphant in 1456.

Notes

References

See also
 Clan Oliphant

Scottish soldiers
People of the Wars of Scottish Independence
Year of birth unknown
1329 deaths
Signatories to the Declaration of Arbroath
Scottish knights
14th-century Scottish people
14th-century soldiers
13th-century Scottish people
Scottish prisoners of war
Oliphant family